Dr. John C. Irons House, also known as the Dr. S. G. Moore Home, is a historic home located at Elkins, Randolph County, West Virginia.  It was built in 1889, and is a two-story Italianate frame dwelling with drop wood siding, a brick foundation and a "T"-shape plan with rear one-story addition.  It has a low pitched gable end to the side with a two-story projecting angled bay added about 1911.

It was listed on the National Register of Historic Places in 1998.

References

Houses on the National Register of Historic Places in West Virginia
Italianate architecture in West Virginia
Houses completed in 1889
Houses in Randolph County, West Virginia
National Register of Historic Places in Randolph County, West Virginia